Romana Petri (born Romana Pezzetta, Rome, 10 September 1955) is an Italian writer. She was the recipient of the Rapallo Carige Prize for Alle case venie in 1998.

References

Italian women novelists
20th-century Italian women writers
20th-century Italian novelists
21st-century Italian novelists
21st-century Italian women writers
Writers from Rome
1955 births
Living people